Mary Grace Kovar (July 6, 1929 – September 21, 2015) was an American statistician.

Kovar worked as chief of the Analytical Coordination Branch of the Division of Analysis at the National Center for Health Statistics.

For many years she was the coordinator of Health, United States, a series of books reporting the health statistics of Americans.
By 1996, she had retired from the NCHS, and had become a senior research scientist at NORC at the University of Chicago.
She was a vice president at NORC by 2000.

She married Earl S. Pollack, a biostatistician at the National Institutes of Health. Pollack died in 2012.

The topics of some of Kovar's best-cited publications include trends in blood lead levels,
infant nutrition and its effects on health,
patterns of sensitivity to allergens,,
longitudinal studies of aging,
and a comparison of the results of in-person interviews versus telephone surveys.

Kovar was elected as a Fellow of the American Statistical Association in 1979, seven years after Pollack. She became a fellow of the American Association for the Advancement of Science in 1990.

Selected publications

References

1929 births
2015 deaths
American statisticians
Women statisticians
Fellows of the American Association for the Advancement of Science
Fellows of the American Statistical Association